The Stratioti or Stradioti ( stratiotes; ;, ; ;) were mercenary units from the Balkans recruited mainly by states of southern and central Europe from the 15th century until the middle of the 18th century. They pioneered light cavalry tactics in European armies in the early modern era.

Name 

One hypothesis proposes that the term is the Italian rendering of Greek στρατιώτες, stratiotes or στρατιώται, stratiotai (soldiers), which denoted cavalrymen who owned pronoia fiefs in the late Byzantine period. It was also used in Ancient Greek as a general term for a soldier being part of an army. According to another hypothesis, it derives from the Italian word strada ("street") which produced stradioti "wanderers" or "wayfarers", figuratively interpreted as errant cavalrymen. Italian variants are stradioti, stradiotti, stratioti, strathiotto, strathioti. In Albanian they are called stratiotë (definite: stratiotët) in French estradiots, in Serbo-Croatian: stratioti, stradioti, in Spanish estradiotes.

Since many stradioti wore a particular cap, in Venice the name cappelletti (sing. cappelletto) was initially used as a synonym for stradiotti or albanesi. In the 16th and 17th centuries the term cappelletti was mainly used for light cavalry recruited from Dalmatia. A feature that distinguished the cappelletti form the stradiotti was their increasing usage of firearms. From the 17th century Venice recruited light cavalry no longer from the Morea, but mainly from Dalmatia and Albania, and the cappelletti gradually replaced the stradiotti. However they had not the same success as light cavalry was gradually abandoned.

History 
The stradioti were recruited in Albania, Greece, Dalmatia, Serbia and Cyprus. Those units continued the military traditions of Byzantine and Balkan cavalry warfare. As such, they had previously served Byzantine and Albanian rulers, they then entered Venetian military service during the Ottoman-Venetian wars in the 15th century. It has been suggested that a ready pool of Albanian stradioti was the product of the northern Albanian tribal system of feud (Gjakmarrja) and consequent emigration. The precise year when stratioti units began to be recruited in western armies is not known. However, under 1371 state decrees of the Venetian Republic those Greeks that lived in Venetian controlled territories were allowed to join the Venetian army.

The precise definition of their ethnic identity was the subject of careful study, while modern scholarship concludes that they were Albanians and Greeks who mainly originated from the Peloponnese. Studies on the origin of their names indicate that around 80% of the stradioti were of Albanian origin, and very few of Slav origin (Crovati). The remainder were Greek, most of whom were captains. Some of the officers' surnames who were of Greek origin are Palaiologos, Spandounios, Laskaris, Rhalles, Komnenos, Psendakis, Maniatis, Spyliotis, Alexopoulos, Psaris, Zacharopoulos, Klirakopoulos, and Kondomitis. A number of them, such as the Palaiologoi and Komnenoi, were members of Byzantine noble families. Others seemed to be of South Slavic origin, such as Soimiris, Vlastimiris, and Voicha. Some renowned Albanian stratioti were the Alambresi, Basta, Bua, Capuzzimadi, Crescia, and Renesi. The study on the names of the stradioti does not indicate that most of them came directly from Albania proper, rather from the Venetian holdings in southern and central Greece. The stradioti who moved with their families to Italy in the late 15th and early 16th centuries had been born in the Peloponnese, where their ancestors immigrated in the late 14th and early 15th century, after the request of the Byzantine Despots of the Morea, Theodore I and Theodore II Palaiologos, who invited the Albanians to serve as military colonists in the Peloponnese in the attempt to resist Ottoman expansion in the Balkans.

While the bulk of stratioti were of Albanian origin from Greece, by the middle of the 16th century there is evidence that many of them had been Hellenized and in some occasions even Italianized. Hellenization was possibly underway prior to service abroad, since stradioti of Albanian origin had settled in Greek lands for two generations before their emigration to Italy. Moreover, since many served under Greek commanders and together with the Greek stradioti, this process continued. Another factor in this assimilative process was the stradioti's and their families' active involvement and affiliation with the Greek Orthodox or Uniate Church communities in the places they lived in Italy. On the other hand the military service in Italy and other European countries slowed and in some cases reversed the process of Hellenization. Those Albanians of Greece who migrated to Italy have been able to maintain their identity more easily than the Arvanites who remained in Greece, hence constituting a part of the Arbëreshë people of Italy.

Activity

Republic of Venice 
With the end of the Byzantine Empire in 1453 and the breakup of the Despotate of the Morea through civil war between 1450 and 1460, Albanian and Greek stradioti increasingly found refuge and employment with the Venetians. The Republic of Venice first used stratioti in their campaigns against the Ottoman Empire and, from c. 1475, as frontier troops in Friuli. Starting from that period, they began to almost entirely replace the Venetian light cavalry in the army. Apart from the Albanian stradioti, Greek and Italian ones were also deployed in the League of Venice at the Battle of Fornovo (1495). The mercenaries were recruited from the Balkans, mainly Christians but also some Muslims. In 1511, a group of stratioti petitioned for the construction of the Greek community of Venice's Eastern Orthodox church in Venice, the San Giorgio dei Greci, and the Scuola dei Greci (Confraternity of the Greeks), in a neighborhood where a Greek community still resides. Impressed by the unorthodox tactics of the stratioti, other European powers quickly began to hire mercenaries from the same region.

Since the first Ottoman–Venetian war (1463–1479) and later Ottoman–Venetian wars of the 15th and 16th century Stratioti units, both Albanian and Greeks served the Venetian forces in the Morea. In addition the Venetian authorities allowed the settlement of Albanians in Napoli di Romagna (Nauplion) in the Argolis region, outside of the walls of the city.  Relations between the two groups and relations between Albanians, Greeks and the central Venetian administration varied. Some families intermarried with each other, while other times disputes erupted as in 1525 when both Greeks and Albanians asked to serve only under the leadership of their own commanders. In the reports of the Venetian commander of Nauplion, Bartolomeo Minio (1479–1483) stressed that the Albanian stratioti were unreliable contrary to the Greek units which he considered loyal. In other reports, attitudes towards Albanians are positive. As Venice lost territory to the Ottomans in the Morea, the numbers of Stratioti the administration employed lowered. By 1524, no more than 400-500 Stratioti remained in Venetian Argolis.

By 1589, four Venetian Stratioti companies remained in Crete. Reports to the Provveditore generale di Candia warn him that the Stratioti should be "actual Albanians" (veramene Albanesi) unlike the Stratioti in Crete who were not "real Albanians but Cypriots and locals who have no military experience". While the origins of these Stratioti were indeed Albanian, more than a century since the settlement of their ancestors in Crete had passed and they had become integrated in the local society. Venetian sources described them more as "farmers than stradioti" who spoke Greek (parlavano greco).

The presence of the Albanian stradioti in Venetian territories for many decades had a significant impact in the way Venetians perceived what it meant to be Albanian. Although Stratioti units settled in western Europe and finally lost contact with their homelands, they were crucial in the spread of Greek-Orthodox and Uniate communities in Venice, as well as in other Italian and Dalmatian cities.

France 

France under Louis XII recruited some 2,000 stradioti in 1497, two years after the battle of Fornovo. Among the French they were known as estradiots and argoulets. The term "argoulet" is believed to come either from the Greek city of Argos, where many of argoulets come  from (Pappas), or from the arcus (bow) and the arquebuse. For some authors argoulets and estradiots are synonymous but for others there are certain differences between them. G. Daniel, citing M. de Montgommeri, says that argoulets and estradiots have the same armoury except that the former wear a helmet. According to others "estradiots" were Albanian horsemen and "argoulets" were Greeks, while Croatians were called "Cravates".

The argoulets were armed with a sword, a mace (metal club) and a short arquebuse. They continued to exist under Charles IX and are noted at the battle of Dreux (1562). They were disbanded around 1600. The English chronicle writer Edward Hall described the "Stradiotes" at the battle of the Spurs in 1513. They were equipped with short stirrups, small spears, beaver hats, and Turkish swords.

The term "carabins" was also used in France as well as in Spain denoting cavalry and infantry units similar to estradiots and argoulets (Daniel G.)(Bonaparte N.). Units of Carabins seem to exist at least till the early 18th century.

Corps of light infantry mercenaries were periodically recruited from the Balkans or Italy mainly during the 15th to 17th centuries. In 1587, the Duchy of Lorraine recruited 500 Albanian cavalrymen, while from 1588 to 1591 five Albanian light cavalry captains were also recruited.

Kingdom of Naples 
The Kingdom of Naples hired Albanians, Greeks and Serbs into the Royal Macedonian Regiment, a light infantry unit active in the 18th century. Spain also recruited this unit.

Spain 
Stratioti were first employed by Spain
in their Italian expedition (see Italian Wars). Gonzalo Fernández de Córdoba ("Gran Capitan") was sent by King Ferdinand II of Aragon ("the  Catholic") to support the kingdom of Naples against the French invasion.
In Calabria Gonzalo had two hundred "estradiotes Griegos, elite cavalry".

Units of estradiotes served also in the Guard of King Ferdinand and, along with the "Alabarderos", are considered the beginnings of the Spanish Royal Guard.

England 
In 1514, Henry VIII of England, employed units of Albanian and Greek stradioti during the battles with the Kingdom of Scotland.
In the 1540s, Duke Edward Seymour of Somerset used Albanian stradioti in his campaign against Scotland.
An account of the presence of stratioti in Britain is given by Nikandros Noukios of Corfu. In about 1545 Noukios followed as a non-combatant the English invasion of Scotland where the English forces included Greeks from Argos under the leadership of Thomas of Argos whose "Courage, and prudence, and experience of wars" was lauded by the Corfiot traveller. Thomas was sent by Henry VIII to Boulogne in 1546, as commander of a battalion of 550 Greeks and was injured in the battle. The King expressed his appreciation to Thomas for his leadership in Boulogne and rewarded him with a good sum of money.

Holy Roman Empire 
In the middle of the 18th century, Albanian stratioti were employed by Empress Maria Theresa during the War of the Austrian Succession against Prussian and French troops.

Tactics 
The stratioti were pioneers of light cavalry tactics during this era. In the early 16th century light cavalry in the European armies was principally remodeled after Albanian stradioti of the Venetian army, Hungarian hussars and German mercenary cavalry units (Schwarzreiter).  They employed hit-and-run tactics, ambushes, feigned retreats and other complex maneuvers. In some ways, these tactics echoed those of the Ottoman sipahis and akinci. They had some notable successes also against French heavy cavalry during the Italian Wars. Their features resembled more the akinjis than the sipahis, this occurred most probably as a result of the defensive character of 15th century Byzantine warfare.

Practices 
They were known for cutting off the heads of dead or captured enemies, and according to Commines they were paid by their leaders one ducat per head.

Equipment 
The stradioti used javelins, swords, maces, crossbows, bows, and daggers. They traditionally dressed in a mixture of Ottoman, Byzantine and European garb: the armor was initially a simple mail hauberk, replaced by heavier armor in later eras. As mercenaries, the stradioti received wages only as long as their military services were needed. They wore helmets which were known as "chaska", from the Spanicsh word "casco". From the end of the 15th century they also used gunpowder weapons.

The stradioti wore particular caps, which were very similar to those of the Albanian ethnographic region of Labëria, with conical shape and a small extension, reinforced inside by several sheets of paper attached together, ensuring surprising resistance. Those caps were called  (Albanian hat) in French.

Notable stratioti 
Thomas of Argos, Greek captain of a battalion of 550 Greek stratioti who served in the English army in the era of Henry VIII. Thomas was injured in the Siege of Boulogne (1546) fighting victoriously against a unit of more than 1,000 French (Moustoxydes, 1856)
Giorgio Basta, Italian general, diplomat, and writer of Arbëreshë origin
Peter Bua, Albanian stratioti captain in the Morea
Mercurio Bua (son of Peter Bua), stratioti captain who participated in the important phases of the Italian Wars between 1489 and 1559 serving the Republic of Venice, the Duke of Milan Ludovico Sforza, the Kingdom of France, the Holy Roman Emperor Maximilian I and then Venice again
Theodore Bua, Albanian stratioti captain
Demetrio Capuzzimati, Albanian stratioti captain in Flanders and Italy
Teodoro Crescia, Albanian stratioti captain in Italy, Flanders, Germany
Panagiotis Doxaras, Greek horseman by the Venetian army and painter (1662–1729)
Mark Gjini Albanian stratioti captain serving under Venice
Krokodeilos Kladas, Greek or Albanian Stratioti captain and military leader
Petros Lantzas (d. 1608), Greek stratioti captain
Michael Tarchaniota Marullus, Greek Renaissance scholar, poet and humanist
Emmanuel Mormoris, 16th century commander
Graitzas Palaiologos, Greek stratioti commander
Giovanni Renesi I (active 1568–1590), Albanian stratioti, served in the Kingdom of Naples
Giovanni Renesi II (1567–1624), Albanian stratioti in Dalmatia and Republic of Venice; active in anti-Ottoman espionage and military action
Demetrio Reres, Albanian Stratioti captain and nobleman

Notes

References

Bibliography

Primary sources 

Available online in Latin language.
 In Italian language.

 first published in 1524.
Battle of Fornovo: Memoirs, 1856 edition, London, vol. 2, p. 201.

Secondary sources 

 
 
 
 
 
 
 
 
 
 

 
 
 
 
 
 

 

 
 
 

 
 
 

 
  Available online

Further reading 

 Katerina B. Korrè, Stradioti, mercenaries of Venice: military and social role (XV-XVI centuries), PhD Thesis, Ionian University 2018 [Available, in Greek, on https://www.didaktorika.gr/eadd/handle/10442/42539] / Κορρέ Κατερίνα Β., Μισθοφόροι stradioti της Βενετίας: πολεμική και κοινωνική λειτουργία (15ος-16ος αιώνας), Διδακτορική Διατριβή, Ιόνιο Πανεπιστήμιο 2018 
Lopez, R. Il principio della guerra veneto-turca nel 1463. "Archivio Veneto", 5 serie, 15 (1934), pp. 47–131.
Μομφερράτου, Αντ. Γ. Σιγισμούνδος Πανδόλφος Μαλατέστας. Πόλεμος Ενετών και Τούρκων εν Πελοποννήσω κατά 1463-6. Αθήνα, 1914.
Sathas, K. N. Documents inédits relatifs à l' histoire de la Grèce au Moyen Âge, publiés sous les auspices de la Chambre des députés de Grèce. Tom. VI: Jacomo Barbarigo, Dispacci della guerra di Peloponneso (1465-6), Paris, 1880–90, pp. 1-116.
 Κορρέ Β. Κατερίνα,"Έλληνες στρατιώτες στο Bergamo. Οι πολιτικές προεκτάσεις ενός εκκλησιαστικού ζητήματος", Θησαυρίσματα 28 (2008), 289-336.
 Stathis Birtachas, «La memoria degli stradioti nella letteratura italiana del tardo Rinascimento», in Tempo, spazio e memoria nella letteratura italiana. Omaggio ad Antonio Tabucchi / Χρόνος, τόπος και μνήμη στην ιταλική λογοτεχνία. Τιμή στον Antonio Tabucchi, a cura di Z. Zografidou, Salonicco, Università Aristotele di Salonicco – Aracne – University Studio Press, 2012, pp. 124–142. Online: https://www.academia.edu/2770159/La_memoria_degli_stradioti_nella_letteratura_italiana_del_tardo_Rinascimento
 "Stradioti, Cappelletti, Compagnie or Milizie Greche: ‘Greek’ Mounted and Foot Troops in the Venetian State (Fifteenth to Eighteenth Centuries)", in A Military History of the Mediterranean Sea: Aspects of War, Diplomacy and Military Elites, eds. Georgios Theotokis and Aysel Yildiz, Leiden: Brill, 2018, pp. 325–346.

External links 

 
Albanian diaspora
Army of the Holy Roman Empire
Arvanites
Greek diaspora
Mercenary units and formations
Military units and formations of the Republic of Venice
16th- and 17th-century warrior types